Butter (also titled Butter's Final Meal) is a 2020 American comedy/drama film directed by Paul A. Kaufman and starring Mira Sorvino, Mykelti Williamson, Brian Van Holt, Ravi Patel, Annabeth Gish and Alex Kersting. It is based on the novel of the same name by Erin Jade Lange.

The film was released on VOD and select theaters by Blue Fox Entertainment on February 25, 2022.

Cast
Alex Kersting as Butter
McKaley Miller as Anna McGinn
Adain Bradley as Trent
Jack Griffo as Parker
Matthew Gold as Tucker Smith
Mira Sorvino as Marian
Mykelti Williamson as Professor Dunn
Ravi Patel as Doctor Bean
Annabeth Gish as Doctor Jennice
Brian Van Holt as Frank
Monte Markham as Dr. Kaufman

Release
Butter was released on VOD and select theaters by Blue Fox Entertainment on February 25, 2022. The film was screened at the Cinequest Film & Creativity Festival and the Socially Relevant Film Festival in 2020.

Reception

Box office
In the United States and Canada, the film earned $73,937 from 308 theaters in its opening weekend.

Critical response
The film currently holds a 43% rating on Rotten Tomatoes based on 14 critical reviews.

John DeFore of The Hollywood Reporter gave the film a negative review and wrote, "While it may resonate for some young viewers, anyone whose reality really resembles that of the film's protagonist should probably look elsewhere."

Pat Padua of The Washington Post wrote a somewhat more favorable review. "'Butter' doesn’t have a fairy-tale ending, but it still feels a little pat in the end, and a few of the monologues sound like something out of a public service announcement. Ultimately, it is, like its conflicted hero, sweet and likable, and you wish it well."

References

External links
 Official website 
 

2020 drama films
2020 films
2020 independent films
American independent films
American drama films
Films based on American novels
Films directed by Paul A. Kaufman
2020s English-language films
2020s American films